List of congresses held by the French Communist Party.

Communist Party congresses
Congresses of communist parties
Congresses
Political party assemblies in France
Communist Party congresses
Communist Party
Communist Party